Mozambique competed at the 2013 World Championships in Athletics in Moscow, Russia, from 10–18 August 2013. A team of one athlete was announced to represent the country in the event.

References

External links
IAAF World Championships – Mozambique

Nations at the 2013 World Championships in Athletics
World Championships in Athletics
Mozambique at the World Championships in Athletics